Hammer Theatre is a performance venue in Downtown San José. Located on the Paseo de San Antonio, the theatre is operated by San José State University.

History 
The Hammer Theatre began as a home for the San José Repertory Theatre Company, which was founded in 1980. The company became known during its early years as the fastest-growing professional theater company in the U.S. To have a theatrical home, the company collaborated with the San José Redevelopment Agency to build the Hammer Theatre in downtown San Jose. The Hammer Theatre, named after former mayor Susan Hammer and her husband, Phil Hammer, was completed in 1997.

In June 2014, the San José Repertory Company declared bankruptcy and the Hammer Theatre was shuttered.

Efforts to reopen the venue resulted in a partnership between San José State University and the city of San José. The Hammer Theatre reopened in March 2016.

Facilities 

 Sobrato Auditorium
 Hammer 4
 Café
 Lounge
 Rooftop Terrace
 Dressing rooms
 Bar/concessions area
 2nd floor lobby
 Outside balconies

Event types 
The Hammer Theatre hosts the following seven categories of entertainment:

 SJSU@Hammer -- San Jose State University music, theater, dance and guest speaker events
 Lights & Action -- Live theater and off-Broadway theatrical productions
 Music w/o Borders -- Musical performances from around the world 
 ArtTech -- Arts, technology and/or multi-media performances
 Hammer Speaks -- Educational lecture series, including National Geographic Live and the Sundance Film Institute
 Holidays@Hammer -- Holiday-related musical, theater and dance performances
 Dance -- Dance performances

References 

San Jose State University
Theatres in San Jose, California